Mary Giovanna Cawse Edmunds (14 December 1808 – 14 April 1850) was a British opera singer.  

Mary Giovanna Cawse was born on 14 December 1808 at No. 13 King Street, Bloomsbury, London, the daughter of painter John Cawse.  Her younger sister Harriet Catherine Fiddes was also an opera singer.  

Mary and Harriet studied voice under Sir George Smart.  Through Smart they came to the attention of Carl Maria von Weber, and the Cawse sisters sang in the second London performance of his cantata The Offering of Devotion at the Shrine of Nature in the Argyll Rooms in 1825.  

A soprano, Mary Cawse made her opera debut at Covent Garden in 1826 in The Castle of Sorrento.  Her significant appearances at Covent Garden include roles in Fra Diavolo, Weber's Der Freischütz, Robert the Devil, John of Paris, and Cinderella.   Elsewhere, she appeared in The Swiss Family, Der Vampyr, and Cosi Fan Tutti.   

Cawse married the Scottish tenor Edmund Edmunds.  They had six children, including pianist Arthur Cawse Edmunds.  She died of bronchitis on 14 April 1850 in Edinburgh.

References 

  

Created via preloaddraft
1808 births
1850 deaths
British opera singers